Hastings Public Schools may refer to:
Hastings Public Schools (Minnesota)
Hastings Public Schools (Nebraska)